The following is a list of Texas A&M Aggies softball seasons. Texas A&M University is a member of the Southeastern Conference of the NCAA Division I.  The Aggies are three time Women's College World Series champions, with the first of those titles coming during the AIAW years, and the others under NCAA organization.  Texas A&M has also appeared in the final event 12 times - 4 under the AIAW and 8 under the NCAA.  The team played its first season in 1973.

References

UCLA
Texas AandM Aggies softball seasons